Barklya is a genus of Australian trees in the legume family, Fabaceae. It belongs to the subfamily Cercidoideae. The sole species is Barklya syringifolia, commonly known as golden crown or golden glory. It grows in rainforest to 20 metres tall. Recorded from Queensland and New South Wales in rain forest.  It is often used as an ornamental.

The genus and species was formally described in 1859 by Victorian Government Botanist Ferdinand von Mueller. Mueller's description was based on plant material collected by the superintendent of the Brisbane Botanic Gardens, Walter Hill, in the vicinity of Pine River to the north of Brisbane.

References

Flora of New South Wales
Flora of Queensland
Trees of Australia
Ornamental trees
Cercidoideae
Monotypic Fabaceae genera
Taxa named by Ferdinand von Mueller